Emke is a surname. Notable people with the surname include:

Georg Emke, Swedish footballer
Mark Emke (born 1959), Dutch rower

See also
Enke